Lucus Angitiae was an Italic and Roman town, the ruins of which are located in the comune of Luco dei Marsi, in the province of L'Aquila in the Abruzzo region of Italy.

References

External links

Roman sites of Abruzzo
Luco dei Marsi